Virú District is one of three districts of the province Virú in Peru.

Localities
Puerto Morín
Santa Elena
San José

References